Shorea glauca is a species of tree in the family Dipterocarpaceae. It is native to Sumatra, Peninsular Malaysia, and Thailand.

References

glauca
Trees of Sumatra
Trees of Peninsular Malaysia
Trees of Thailand
Taxonomy articles created by Polbot